Wajid Ullah Khan is a Pakistani politician who had been a member of the Provincial Assembly of Khyber Pakhtunkhwa from August 2018 till January 2023.

Political career

He was elected to the Provincial Assembly of Khyber Pakhtunkhwa as a candidate of Pakistan Tehreek-e-Insaf from Constituency PK-75 (Peshawar-X) in 2018 Pakistani general election.

References

Living people
Pakistan Tehreek-e-Insaf MPAs (Khyber Pakhtunkhwa)
Year of birth missing (living people)